Medinomyia is a genus of tachinid flies in the family Tachinidae.

Distribution
Myanmar.

Species
Medinomyia canescens Mesnil, 1957.

References

Endemic fauna of Myanmar
Diptera of Asia
Exoristinae
Tachinidae genera